Seyed Mohammad Shahcheraghi , (born 10 June 1934) is an Iranian Ayatollah. He represented the Supreme Leader of Iran in Semnan province, as well being the Imam of Friday Prayer in Semnan. He was elected by the people of Semnan province to represent them in the Assembly of Experts for two terms. He currently retains that position.

Early life and education 
Mohammad Shahcheraghi was born on 10 June 1934 in Hasanabad, Damghan County to a religious family. His father, Seyed Hassan Shahcheraghi, was a cleric who gave prayers in their local village. After finishing school in his hometown, he entered the Islamic seminary in Damghan, where he was taught by Sheikh Mohammad Reza Khodaei. After six years there, he left to Qom to further his Islamic studies in Qom Seminary. It was here he attained Ijtihad, and reached the rank Ayatollah.

Teachers 
Here are some of Shahcerhaghi's teachers during his times in seminaries.

 Sheikh Mohammad Reza Khodaei
 Sheikh Gholam Hossein Kheiri
 Haj Mirza Agha Alemi
 Mohammad-Reza Golpaygani
 Hossein Borujerdi
 Ruhollah Khomeini
 Morteza Haeri Yazdi
 Seyed Mohammad Mohaghegh Damad
 Muhammad Husayn Tabatabai

Politics and views 

After the resignation of Abbas Ali Akhtari in 2003, Ali Khamenei chose Shahcheraghi to replace him as the representative of the Surpeme Leader of Iran in Semnan province. He was also the Imam of Friday Prayer in Semnan. He held those positions until 2021, where he resigned and was replaced by Morteza Motei by Ali Khamenei. He was elected by the people of Semnan province to represent them in the 2006 and 2016 elections for the Assembly of Experts. He currently retains that position.

He has spoken out about the water issues in Semnan, and urged the management to fulfil the needs and satisfactions of the people. He also urged the protestors during the 2021 Khuzestan protests to not "fall into the trap of the enemies" i.e. the oppositions of the Iranian Government.

He has also stated that having good hygiene and abiding by health and safety guidelines is an "Islamic Duty". He urged the people of Semnan to follow the health and safety precautions of COVID-19.

See also 

 List of Ayatollahs
 List of members in the Fifth Term of the Council of Experts
 List of members in the Fourth Term of the Council of Experts
 List of provincial representatives appointed by Supreme Leader of Iran
 COVID-19 pandemic in Iran
 Abbas Ali Akhtari

References 

1934 births
Living people
People from Semnan Province
Iranian politicians
Iranian ayatollahs
Members of the Assembly of Experts